Somerset Road railway station was a railway station in Edgbaston, Birmingham, England, on the Midland Railway's Birmingham West Suburban Railway. The station had two platforms and was located in a cutting.

History

It was opened in 1876.

On 14 May 1897, John Thomas Johnson ran down the incline to the platform, but was unable to stop on reaching the platform and fell in front of the advancing train. Part of his left foot was cut off and his head was injured. He survived the accident.

On 16 February 1901, George Grainger attempted to alight from a train before it had pulled up at Somerset Road station and fell between the footboard and the platform. He was crushed to death.

It closed in 1930 due to lack of patronage.

Station masters

Nathaniel Dottoms 1877 - 1878 (formerly station master at Selly Oak)
J. Marshall 1878 - 1879 (afterwards station master at Coughton)
J. Ashley 1879 - 1880 (afterwards station master at Coughton)
Frederick Watkin 1880 - 1881 (afterwards station master at Bournville)
F. Ripley 1881 - 1882 (afterwards station master at Hornby)
James Woodyatt 1882 - 1883
W.J. Young 1883  (afterwards station master at Church Road)
T. Clarke 1883 - 1884 (afterwards station master at Darley Dale)
A. H. Baldwin 1884 - 1886 (formerly station master at Bentley, afterwards station master at North Walsall)
L. Lovell 1886  (formerly station master at Bentley, afterwards station master at Streetly)
Mr. Taylor 1886 - 1887  (afterwards station master at North Walsall)
William Robert Ambler 1887 - 1888 (afterwards station master at Selly Oak)
Thomas Jones 1888 - 1890 
Henry Lewis 1890 - 1892 (afterwards station master at Selly Oak)
G. Mackley 1892 - 1893  (afterwards station master at Killamarsh)
Samuel Pitt 1893 - 1894 (afterwards station master at Oakley, Bedfordshire)
Albert Edward Mettam 1894 - 1900 (afterwards station master at Brownhills)
John Selby 1900 - 1914 (formerly station master at Streetly)
J.E. Abell 1914 - 1917 (afterwards station master at Salford Priors)
G. Hayes from 1917

Remains

There are virtually no remains of the station, the only one being a bricked up entrance on the Somerset Road bridge over the present Cross-City Line, between the University railway station and Five Ways railway station.

References

External links
Warwickshire Railways entry

Disused railway stations in Birmingham, West Midlands
Railway stations in Great Britain opened in 1876
Railway stations in Great Britain closed in 1930
1876 establishments in England
1930 disestablishments in England
Edgbaston
Former Midland Railway stations